Historic Saranac Lake is a non-profit, membership organization dedicated to the preservation of the history and architectural heritage of the Saranac Lake area of New York State in the Adirondacks.

History

Founded on 15 January 1980, the organization has successfully nominated over 170 properties for listing on the National Register of Historic Places. Since 1987, Historic Saranac Lake has also hosted lectures on local history and concerts of traditional Adirondack music.  They have joined with other organizations in preserving the 1894 laboratory of Edward Livingston Trudeau, the 1904 Union Depot of the Delaware and Hudson Railroad/New York Central Railroad and the cottage where, in 1945, Béla Bartók spent his last summer writing his Third Piano Concerto and Viola Concerto. They have also restored several historic houses that were in danger of being torn down.

About 
Historic Saranac Lake is led by Amy B. Catania, Executive Director, along with Museum Administrator Chessie Monks-Kelly and Oral History Coordinator Kaitlyn Gochenaur. The Board of Directors consists of:

 Brandon Cambell, President
 Rich Loeber, Vice President
 Karen Morris, Secretary
 Andrew Rawdon, Treasurer
 Ruth Chasolen
 Dot Fobare
 Sunita Halasz
 Amy Jones
 Elaine Sunde
 Beth Van Anden
 John Wheeler

Programs

The organization offers walking tours of the village, and produces educational events that feature historic sites and lectures on the unique history of the region, from its popularity among sportsmen and nature lovers starting in the mid-18th century to its pre-eminence in the treatment of tuberculosis from 1890 to 1950. They have published a number of articles and books focused on the lives and architecture of the region, including Cure Cottages of Saranac Lake by Philip L. Gallos.

Since 2008, Historic Saranac Lake has operated a wiki that has grown to more than five thousand pages with more than eight thousand photographs. It covers Saranac Lake's geographically large school district (more than 600 square miles) which includes areas such as Loon Lake, Paul Smiths and Gabriels.  The wiki was mentioned in a 2010 article on "Crowdsourcing" written by Tim Grove of the Smithsonian Institution on the American Association of State and Local History website.

See also
Adirondack Scenic Railroad
Adirondack Cottage Sanitarium
Church Street Historic District
Cure Cottages of Saranac Lake
National Register of Historic Places listings in Essex County
National Register of Historic Places listings in Franklin County
Saranac Lake Union Depot

References

External links
Historic Saranac Lake
New York State Arts - Historic Saranac Lake listing
Adirondack Enterprise - Story on the Trudeau Laboratory
Saranac Lake's Union Depot

New York
1980 establishments in New York (state)
Historical societies in New York (state)
Franklin County, New York
Organizations established in 1980
Tourist attractions in Franklin County, New York
Saranac Lake, New York